Kathryn Colvin, CVO (born  1945) is a British diplomat.

Life
She received a BA(Hons) at the University of Bristol. She went on to obtain a Diplome d'Etudes Superieure from Bordeaux, and become a FIL.

She joined the Foreign Office in 1968, and spent the period 1968–1994 in the Information Research Department (known from 1977 as the Information and Analysis Department). From 1980 to 1990 she was in the United Kingdom delegation to the Office of the United Nations High Commissioner for Human Rights in Geneva.

In 1994-1995 she was Deputy Head of the OSCE Department, in 1995-1998 of the West Europe Department, and 1998-1999 of the Whitehall Liaison Department.

From 1999 to 2001 she was Her Majesty's Vice Marshal of the Diplomatic Corps, a senior member of the Royal Household and the Queen's link with the diplomatic community in London. The role involved arranging the annual Diplomatic Corps Reception by the Sovereign, organising the regular presentation of credentials ceremonies for Ambassadors and High Commissioners, and supervising attendance of diplomats at state events.

She was Ambassador to the Holy See 2001 to 2005.

She was made a CVO in 2002.

References

1945 births
Living people
Alumni of the University of Bristol
Commanders of the Royal Victorian Order
Ambassadors of the United Kingdom to the Holy See
British women ambassadors
Information Research Department